Naser is a masculine given name, commonly found in the Arabic and Persian languages. Alternative spellings of this name, possibly due to transliteration include Nasser, Nassar, Nasir, Naseer, or Nacer. People with this name may include:

People with the given name Naser 
 Naser Khader (born 1963), Danish politician
 Naser Maleknia (died 2007), Iranian academic
 Naser Mohammadkhani (born 1957), Iranian football striker
 Naser Orić (born 1967), Bosnian military officer
 Naser Sahiti (born 1966), Kosovan professor and rector of the University Prishtina
 Naser Al Shami (born 1982), Syrian boxer
 Naser Makarem Shirazi (born 1927), Iranian cleric

People with the middle name or father name Naser 
 Abdul-Raof Naser Kher (born 1982), Libyan futsal player
 Ahmed Naser Al-Raisi, Emirati military officer

People with the surname Naser 
 Hani Naser (1950–2020), Jordanian-American musician
 M. A. Naser (1921–2004), Bangladeshi educator
 Sumaya Farhat Naser (born 1948), Palestinian peace activist
 Yekta Naser (born 1978), Iranian actress

References 

Arabic masculine given names
Arabic-language surnames